Bandon GAA is a Gaelic football and Hurling club based in Bandon in County Cork, Republic of Ireland.
The club is affiliated with Carbery division of Cork.

In 2007, Bandon won the West Cork Junior A Football Championship, beating Muintir Bhaire in the final.  The club's hurling team meanwhile were runners-up in the Cork Intermediate Hurling Championship.  They beat Kanturk in the semi-final but were overcome by Fr. O'Neill's in the final.
In 2016 Bandon won the Cork Premier Intermediate Hurling Championship beating Fermoy in the final.  The club's football team meanwhile won the Cork Intermediate Football Championship. They beat Rockchapel in the final to achieve the "double".

Honours
 Cork Premier Intermediate Hurling Championship Winners 2016 Runners-Up 2012
 Cork Intermediate Hurling Championship Winners (3) 1952, 1974, 2011 Runners-Up 1931, 2007, 2008
 Cork Intermediate Football Championship Winners (1) 2016 Runners-Up 1982
 Cork Junior Hurling Championship Winners (4) 1929, 1949, 1971, 1999
 Cork Junior Football Championship Winners (5) 1925, 1929, 1953, 1975, 2015 Runners-Up 1952
 Cork Senior Hurling League Winners (1) 1977
 Cork Under-21 Hurling Championship Runners-Up 1975, 1976
 Cork Under-21 Football Championship Runners-Up 1973
 Cork Minor Hurling Championship Winners (1) 1942  Runners-Up 1969, 1972, 1973, 1974, 1996
 Cork Minor A Hurling Championship Winners (1) 1995
 Cork Minor A Football Championship Winners (3) 1996, 2005, 2009
 Cork Premier 2 Minor Hurling Championship Runners-Up 2010
 Cork Minor Football Championship Runners-Up 1945, 1954, 1974
 Cork Minor B Football Championship Winners (1) 2015
 South West Junior A Hurling Championship Winners (13) 1929, 1934, 1935, 1936, 1937, 1949, 1960, 1971, 1975, 1990, 1995, 1999, 2009  Runners-Up 1932, 1940, 1941, 1968, 1969, 1984, 1991, 1997, 1998
 South West Junior A Football Championship Winners (16) 1929, 1947, 1950, 1951, 1952, 1953, 1960, 1970, 1971, 1975, 1986, 1989, 2007, 2008, 2011, 2015  Runners-Up 1936, 1941, 1948, 1964
 South West Cork Junior B Hurling Championship Winners (3) 1969, 1971, 1976  Runners-Up 1975
 South West Cork Junior B Football Championship Winners (2) 1972, 2018  Runners-Up 2011
 West Cork Junior C Hurling Championship Winners (2) 1997, 1999 Runners-Up 1982(?), 1991, 1998, 2000
 West Cork Junior C Football Championship Winners (1) 1981 Runners-Up 1976, 1977
 West Cork Under-21 Hurling Championship Winners (14) 1970, 1971, 1972, 1974, 1975, 1976, 1977, 1978, 1996, 1999, 2005, 2006, 2009, 2012  Runners-Up 1969, 1995, 2000, 2004, 2007, 2013
 West Cork Under-21 Football Championship Winners (6) 1973, 1974, 1975, 1976, 2005, 2008  Runners-Up 1970, 1971, 2000, 2006, 2011
 West Cork Under-21 B Football Championship Runners-Up 2016, 2017, 2018, 2022
 West Cork Minor A Hurling Championship Winners (22) 1941(?), 1942, 1943, 1944, 1954, 1963, 1965, 1966, 1968, 1969, 1970, 1971, 1972, 1973, 1974, 1975, 1976, 1987, 1995, 2003, 2004, 2008, 2022  Runners-Up 1949(?), 1962, 1967, 1983, 1991
 West Cork Minor A Football Championship Winners (7) 1945, 1954, 1973, 1974, 1976, 1996, 2005  Runners-Up 1963, 1968, 1975, 1977, 1983, 1988, 1995, 2002, 2004
 West Cork Minor B Hurling Championship Winners  (2) 1984, 1985
 Feile na nGael Division 5 Cup Winners  (1) 2019

Notable players
 Darren Crowley
 Ronan Crowley - 2017 Cork Senior Hurling Championship top scorer and London Senior 2021 Championship Winner with Robert Emmets
 Pádraig Crowley  - National Hurling League medal in 1981
 Robert Wilmot -  1973 Cork, All-Ireland winning team . U21 dual player with Cork , Minor dual player with Cork .
 Michael Cahalane
 Noel Callagher
 Mark Sugrue

All-time results

Senior

References

External links
https://web.archive.org/web/20071118235154/http://southernstar.ie/article.php?id=370
https://books.google.com/books?id=bTtWLgPXtsAC&pg=PA211&lpg=PA211&dq=bandon+hurling&source=web&ots=5AuXFngKSX&sig=lAMLKmCvdwZAxW0YRJBp1Ce73EI&hl=en
http://www.bandongaa.com/
http://www.hoganstand.com/Cork/ArticleForm.aspx?ID=38640
Bandon GAA on GAAinfo

Hurling clubs in County Cork
Gaelic football clubs in County Cork
Gaelic games clubs in County Cork
Bandon, County Cork